In mathematics, in the realm of group theory, the stability group of subnormal series is the group of automorphisms that act as identity on each quotient group.

Group theory